Liu Pingyuan (born February 13, 1993) is a Chinese mixed martial artist (MMA). He currently competes in the bantamweight division in the  Ultimate Fighting Championship (UFC).

Mixed martial arts career

Early career 
Liu started his professional MMA career since 2010. He fought primary in China and Mongolia  and amassed a record of 11-5 prior signed by UFC.

Ultimate Fighting Championship
Liu made his UFC debut on July 22, 2018 on UFC Fight Night: Shogun vs. Smith against Damian Stasiak.  He won the fight via unanimous decision.

His next fight came on November 24, 2018 at UFC Fight Night: Blaydes vs. Ngannou 2 against Martin Day. He won the fight via split decision.

Liu faced Jonathan Martinez on July 13, 2019 at UFC Fight Night: de Randamie vs. Ladd. He lost the fight via knockout in round three.

Liu faced Kang Kyung-ho on December 21, 2019 at UFC Fight Night: Edgar vs. The Korean Zombie. He lost the fight via split decision.

Personal life 
Liu trains at Team Alpha Male alongside another UFC Chinese fighter Yadong Song and he  is the godfather of Song's son.

Mixed martial arts record

|-
|Loss
|align=center| 15–6
|Kang Kyung-ho
|Decision (split)
|UFC Fight Night: Edgar vs. The Korean Zombie 
|
|align=center|3
|align=center|5:00
|Busan, South Korea
|   
|-
|Loss
|align=center| 15–5
|Jonathan Martinez
|KO (knee)
|UFC Fight Night: de Randamie vs. Ladd 
|
|align=center|3
|align=center|3:54
|Sacramento, California, United States
|
|-
|Win
|align=center| 15–4
|Martin Day
|Decision (split)
|UFC Fight Night: Blaydes vs. Ngannou 2
|
|align=center| 3
|align=center| 5:00
|Beijing, China
|
|-
|Win
|align=center|14–4
|Damian Stasiak
|Decision (unanimous)
|UFC Fight Night: Shogun vs. Smith
|
|align=center| 3
|align=center| 5:00
|Hamburg, Germany
|
|-
|Win
|align=center| 13–4
|Yuichi Ohashi
|TKO (punches)
|WLF: W.A.R.S. 18
|
|align=center| 1
|align=center| 0:12
|Barkam, China
|
|-
|Win
|align=center| 12–4
|Nikolay Baykin
|Submission (armbar)
|WLF: W.A.R.S. 12
|
|align=center| 2
|align=center| 2:49
|Zhengzhou, China
|
|-
|Win
|align=center| 11–4
|Umidjon Musayev
|TKO (knees to the body)
|WLF E.P.I.C. 9
|
|align=center| 1
|align=center| 3:48
|Zhengzhou, China
|
|-
|Win
|align=center| 10–4
|Beno Adamia
|Submission (inverted triangle choke)
|WLF E.P.I.C. 6
|
|align=center| 1
|align=center| N/A
|Zhengzhou, China
|
|-
|Win
|align=center| 9–4
|Andre Paulet
|Submission (guillotine choke)
|WLF E.P.I.C. 4
|
|align=center| 1
|align=center| 5:00
|Zhengzhou, China
|
|-
|Win
|align=center| 8–4
|Him Chan Jo
|Decision (unanimous)
|WLF E.P.I.C. 2
|
|align=center|3
|align=center|5:00
|Zhengzhou, China
|
|-
|Win
|align=center| 7–4
|Arslan Kazimagomedov
|TKO (punches)
|WLF E.P.I.C. 1
|
|align=center| 1
|align=center| N/A
|Zhengzhou, China
|
|-
|Win
|align=center| 6–4
|Lianjie Liu
|KO (punch)
|Ranik Ultimate Fighting Federation 9
|
|align=center| 1
|align=center| 0:17
|Sanya, Henan, China
|
|-
|Loss
|align=center|5–4
|Meixuan Zhang
|Submission (heel hook)
|Ranik Ultimate Fighting Federation 8
|
|align=center| 1
|align=center| 3:11
|Hohhot, Mongolia
|
|-
|Win
|align=center|5–3
|Zhifa Shang
|Decision (split)
|Ranik Ultimate Fighting Federation 6
|
|align=center|3
|align=center|5:00
|Hohhot, Mongolia
|
|-
|Win
|align=center|4–3
|Meixuan Zhang
|Decision (split)
|Ranik Ultimate Fighting Federation 5
|
|align=center| 3
|align=center| 5:00
|Hohhot, Mongolia
|
|-
|Win
|align=center|3–3
|Liang Yang
|Submission (armbar)
|Ranik Ultimate Fighting Federation 4
|
|align=center| 2
|align=center| 3:03
|Hohhot, Mongolia
|
|-
|Win
|align=center|2–3
|Lianjie Liu
|Submission (armbar)
|Ranik Ultimate Fighting Federation 3
|
|align=center| 1
|align=center| 4:31
|Chongqing, China
|
|-
|Loss
|align=center|1–3
|Rijirigala Amu
|Decision (unanimous)
|Ranik Ultimate Fighting Federation 2
|
|align=center| 3
|align=center| 5:00
|Chongqing, China
|
|-
|Win
|align=center|1–2
|Dapeng Wang
|Submission (armbar)
|Top of the Forbidden City 6
|
|align=center| 1
|align=center| 0:54
|Beijing, China
|
|-
|Loss
|align=center| 0–2
|Meixuan Zhang
|TKO (submission to punches)
|Ranik Ultimate Fighting Federation 1
|
|align=center| 2
|align=center| N/A
|Shanghai, China
|
|-
|Loss
|align=center| 0–1
|Chengjie Wu
|TKO (punches)
|Xian Sports University: Ultimate Wrestle
|
|align=center| 2
|align=center| 4:21
|Guangzhou, China
|
|-

See also
List of current UFC fighters
List of female mixed martial artists

References

External links
 
 

Living people
1993 births
Bantamweight mixed martial artists
Sportspeople from Henan
Chinese practitioners of Brazilian jiu-jitsu
Chinese male mixed martial artists
People from Zhengzhou
Ultimate Fighting Championship male fighters
Mixed martial artists utilizing sanshou
Mixed martial artists utilizing Brazilian jiu-jitsu